Imperatrice (May 26, 1938 – August 9, 1972) was an American Thoroughbred racehorse and broodmare. She was the  dam of Somethingroyal and second dam of the 1973 U.S. Triple Crown champion and Hall of Fame inductee, Secretariat (by Bold Ruler).

A bay mare bred in New Jersey, Imperatrice was bred by William H. LaBoyteaux, president of Johnson & Higgins. He died in 1947 and his horses were all sold by the Executors of the LaBoyteaux Estate. Among them, Imperatrice was purchased for $30,000 by Christopher Chenery's Meadow Stud. Trained for LaBoyteaux by George M. Odom, she raced 31 times with 11 wins, 7 shows, and 2 places. Some of her winning efforts included the New England Oaks, New Rochelle Handicap, the Test Stakes, and the Fall Highweight Handicap.       
    
Imperatrice lived to the age of 34 before being euthanized due to age related urinal and digestive complications. She was the dam of winners Imperial Hill (Hill Prince), Scattered (Whirlaway), Speedwell (Bold Ruler), Squared Away2 (Piping Rock) and was the third dam of successful New York sire Cure the Blues (through daughter Speedwell). Her daughter Scattered  (April 15, 1945 - January 18, 1979) also lived nearly as long.

Influence

Imperatrice's influence is not limited only to Thoroughbreds, but Quarter Horses as well, as Imperatrice is the fourth dam of Quarter Horse Dash For Cash through daughter Scattered.

Imperatrice is considered to be a Reines-de-Course.

Breeding

References 

1938 racehorse births
1972 racehorse deaths
Racehorses bred in New Jersey
Racehorses trained in the United States
Thoroughbred family 2-s